Ruslan Gasimov (born 8 November 1979 in Leningrad) is an ethnic Azerbaijani judoka from Russia.

Achievements

External links
 
 

1979 births
Living people
Russian male judoka
Azerbaijani emigrants to Russia
Olympic judoka of Russia
Judoka at the 2008 Summer Olympics